Cagliari is a city in Sardinia, Italy.

Cagliari may also refer to:

 Province of Cagliari
 Cagliari-Elmas Airport
 Cagliari Calcio football club
 Roman Catholic Archdiocese of Cagliari
 Cagliari Observatory
 59 Mountain Infantry Division Cagliari An Italian division of World War II
 Paolo Veronese - an Italian painter of the Renaissance, also known as Paolo Cagliari
 See also The Cabinet of Dr. Caligari (disambiguation)